Serixia literata is a species of beetle in the family Cerambycidae. It was described by Francis Polkinghorne Pascoe in 1858. It is known from Malaysia, Borneo and Sulawesi.

References

Serixia
Beetles described in 1858